Interlaken Airport  is a former military airbase in Interlaken, Switzerland. Interlaken Airport was constructed during World War II. The airbase is now closed to scheduled commercial flights. Most recently, in 2007, Interlaken Airbase was used for the sixth round of the Red Bull Air Race.

References

Notes

Airports in Switzerland